is a Japanese fantasy manga series by Kazutomo Ichitomo. It has been serialized online via Kadokawa Shoten's ComicWalker website since October 2018 and has been collected in eight tankōbon volumes. An anime television series adaptation by C2C premiered in January 2023.

Plot
Saitō, a young handyman from Japan, has been feeling inadequate in his job on Earth, despite the skills he developed. In his dejection over getting fired by his unappreciative boss, he accidentally walked in front of a speeding truck and was subsequently displaced into a fantasy world, where he was taken in by an adventuring party. With the party members' personal quirks hindering their performance, Saitō begins lending them a helping hand, carrying essentials, picking locks and giving them vital reminders, thus making him indispensable to his new friends.

Characters

A Japanese handyman who suffers from a slight insecurity complex, but is more capable than he realizes. Professionally skilled in appraising and repairing items and picking locks, he becomes the effective thief of his adventuring party.

Morlock's adopted daughter is a warrior and the main fighter of Saitō's adventuring party. A former slave girl, she lost her parents while they were living in the wilderness until Morlock found and took her into his care. She is very self-conscious and also has a fear of long, slimy creatures, including eels. She forms a crush on Saitō after witnessing his skills and personality in action, but is too shy to admit this to him.

A female moonlight fairy cleric. However, while her healing magic and her ability to turn undead are highly appreciated, she charges fees for her services, even from her friends and allies. She uses the gold coins thus gained as sacrifices to the Goddess of the Moon, who had cursed her race to shrink in size if not receiving such regular offerings.
 / 

The mage of Saitō's adventuring party. While capable in terms of magical power, he is extremely scatterbrained, often even forgetting which side he is actually on or the correct incantations for his spell repertoire. It is hinted that his actual name is Bergheim Chrome and he lost his memorial capacities due to a curse when he went to investigate some old magic over twenty years ago. He also suffers from a chronically bad back and likes to woo any pretty female he meets.

The female human propietor of a shop providing weapons and equipment for adventurers.  Despite looking naive, she is a shrewd businessgirl who recognizes the true worth of any merchandise she gets offered.

A dwarf who, most unusual for his race, possesses the capability of using arcane magic, making him a natural mage. He claims to be a former student of Morlock, before the latter apparently lost his memories.

A female magical beast hunter.

A scarred dual-classed thief/mage and Lilyza's partner who develops a crush on Saito.

Franlil Nil Arnil is a high elf with - unlike most of her kind - underdeveloped magical abilities; hence she has chosen a career as a fighter. Highly confrontational, she likes to leap into close combat with her trademark taloned gauntlets.

Franlil's companion, a female cleric with rather weak magical abilities. She is a blood fetishist, and cares for Franlil both as a love interest and means of statisfying her cravings.

A rather plain fighter who is labeled by the kingdom's officials as an idol hero.

An average-level sorceress with a dislike for reptiles who is labeled by the kingdom's officials as an idol hero.

A round-faced, cowardly and deceitful cleric and the nephew of the king's high priest who is labeled by the kingdom's officials as an idol hero. He later turns over a new leaf after befriending Saitou and the Hero. 

A powerful ninja assassin who has the ability of "shadow-binding", i.e. to paralyze anyone whose shadow he steps on.

A gluttonous black crystal fairy mage, Ravella's best friend and Kisurugi's partner.

A 400-year-old witch who falls in love with Kisurugi. Originally kept young through a demon's curse, she has begun to age again after she falls in love with Kisurugi.
King Maderaka

The King of the realm which includes the Great Labyrinth.

A Demon King who was defeated by King Maderaka, down to his still-living head, and thereafter became friends with him. He continues adventuring, mostly in the King's interest, using an artificial body which allows him to pass as a human knight.

Media

Manga
Handyman Saitō in Another World is written and illustrated by Kazutomo Ichitomo. The series began serialization online via Kadokawa Shoten's ComicWalker website in October 2018. It has been collected in eight volumes as of December 23, 2022. At Anime NYC 2022, Yen Press announced that they licensed the manga for English publication.

Anime
On January 19, 2022, an anime television series adaptation was announced. It is produced by C2C and directed by Toshiyuki Kubooka, with scripts written by Kenta Ihara, character designs handled by Yōko Tanabe, and music composed by Tomotaka Ōsumi. The series premiered on January 8, 2023, on AT-X and other networks. The opening theme song, "kaleidoscope", is performed by Teary Planet, while the ending theme song, is performed by Konoco. Crunchyroll has licensed the series.

References

External links
  
  
 

2023 anime television series debuts
Anime series based on manga
AT-X (TV network) original programming
C2C (studio)
Crunchyroll anime
Fantasy anime and manga
Isekai anime and manga
Japanese webcomics
Kadokawa Dwango franchises
Kadokawa Shoten manga
Seinen manga
Webcomics in print
Yen Press titles